The Torino Grand Prix was the first qualifying Gliding Grand Prix for the FAI World Grand Prix 2008. 
It was a demonstration event for the World Air Games Turin 2009.

External links
World Air Games, official WAG news on FAI website
World Air Games 2009, official site of WAG 2009

Gliding competitions
International sports competitions hosted by Italy